Boyfriends is a 1996 British independent film. Three gay couples, all of whom are suffering relationship problems, spend a weekend at the seaside and learn how to deal with their issues from each other. The film was written and directed by Tom Hunsinger and Neil Hunter. The film was James Dreyfus' last role as an unknown before taking the part of Constable Goody in The Thin Blue Line. The film also starred Mark Sands, Michael Urwin, Andrew Ableson, David Coffey, Darren Petrucci and Michael McGrath.

Plot
Paul, Matt and Will, three best friends decide to go on holiday together. Paul (James Dreyfus) brings his lover Ben, but their five-year relationship is unstable owing to Paul's continued moodiness over the death of his brother Mark; Matt brings Owen, with whom he wants a lifelong relationship but whose boisterous personality doesn't suit him; and Will brings Adam, a 20-year-old one-night stand. Mark's lover also comes along for some sense of closure.

Cast
Only the seven main characters and Mark appear throughout the entire film.

 James Dreyfus as Paul
 Mark Sands as Ben
 Michael Urwin as Matt
 Andrew Ableson as Owen
 David Coffey as Will
 Darren Petrucci as Adam
 Michael McGrath as James
 Russell Higgs as Mark

Soundtrack
The film's closing music is Dinah Washington's I Wish I Knew the Name (Of the Boy in My Dreams)".

Critical receptionBoyfriends'' won the 1996 Best Featured Film Award at the Torino International Gay & Lesbian Film Festival. General critical reviews were mixed, with one describing the film as "a biting, shrewd and scathingly funny dissection of gay relationships". Another critic, however, wrote "Boyfriends suffers from too many soap-opera-like subplots that seem set up to create tension".

References

External links
 
 
 

1996 films
British LGBT-related films
LGBT-related drama films
1996 LGBT-related films
British drama films
Gay-related films
1990s English-language films
1990s British films